Two ships operated by the Sri Lanka Navy have had the name SLNS Sayurala.

 , an ex-Indian Coast Guard  which enter service in Sri Lanka Navy in 2009 and returned to India in 2011
 SLNS Sayurala (2016), an Indian-built  which was commissioned in 2017 

Sri Lanka Navy ship names